The Curious Case of Benjamin Button is a musical with book and lyrics by Jethro Compton, music and lyrics by Darren Clark, and based on the 1922 short story of the same name by F. Scott Fitzgerald.

Productions 
The musical made its world premiere at the Southwark Playhouse on 15 May 2019 for a limited run until 8 June. The production was directed by Jethro Compton. The cast included James Marowe in the titular role, alongside Matt Burns, Rosalind Ford, Joey Hickman, and Philippa Hogg.

Plot 
The musical takes place at the end of World War l in a small fishing village. Benjamin Button is born as an old man and ages in reverse.

Critical reception 
The musical received five star reviews from WhatsOnStage, Broadway World, The Reviews Hub and The Upcoming.

References 

2019 musicals
British musicals
F. Scott Fitzgerald
Magic realism
Musicals based on short fiction